Lester B. Rothman (August 12, 1926 — July 27, 2022) was an American former professional basketball player. He played for the Chicago American Gears (one game) and Syracuse Nationals (thirteen games) in the National Basketball League during the 1946–47 season and averaged 4.5 points per game. In the American Basketball League, he played for the Paterson Crescents and Elizabeth Braves.

Rothman also had a brief minor league baseball career. In 1945 he split time between the Norfolk Tars and Wellsville Yankees.

Rothman died on July 27, 2022, at the age of 95.

References

External links
Career statistics at Pro Basketball Encyclopedia and basketball-reference.com

1926 births
2022 deaths
American Basketball League (1925–1955) players
American men's basketball players
Baseball players from New York (state)
Basketball players from New York City
Chicago American Gears players
Forwards (basketball)
Guards (basketball)
Jewish American baseball people
LIU Brooklyn Blackbirds men's basketball players
Norfolk Tars players
Paterson Crescents players
Sportspeople from Brooklyn
Syracuse Nationals players
Wellsville Yankees players
21st-century American Jews
Burials at Mount Hebron Cemetery (New York City)